was a Japanese musician and vocalist of Japanese visual kei rock band Kagrra,.

History
In 1998, along with musicians Izumi and Nao, he founded a Visual Kei rock band called Crow. Two years later, they signed to PS Company and changed the band's name to Kagrra,. He wrote most of the lyrics for the band, often using ancient kanji characters not used in modern Japanese writing. In 2011, after the band's "demise," Isshi began working solo on shiki∞project. He was found dead in his Tokyo apartment at age 32.

References

Visual kei musicians
1978 births
2011 deaths
20th-century Japanese musicians